Nicholas Lynedoch Graham is a musician, songwriter and music producer from the UK. He was born in Durban, South Africa, in January 1945, before his family returned to the UK in 1960.

His musical career began when joining UK band The End in 1965. Following their demise, he became an original member of Tucky Buzzard. In 1972, he played keyboards for David Bowie including on the Ziggy Stardust Tour during August and September 1972, and appears on the album Bowie at the Beeb. He was A & R manager and staff producer first at Polydor Records and then at CBS Records. 

As a producer and songwriter, he went on to score multiple hits for The Nolans, Bros (including the UK No. 1 "I Owe You Nothing"), Let Loose, Ant & Dec (including the UK No. 1 "Let's Get Ready to Rhumble"), Code Red, Shakin' Stevens and Aaron Carter, among others.

During the 2000s, he was a Eurovision A&R consultant to the BBC for a few years, as well as becoming a director for PRS for Music for over a decade.

On 14 October 2014, Graham was presented with a BASCA Gold Badge Award in recognition of his unique contribution to music.

References

1945 births
English record producers
English keyboardists
English songwriters
Living people